Himberg am Wald is a municipality in the district of Bruck an der Leitha in the Austrian state of Lower Austria.

It belonged to Wien-Umgebung District which was dissolved in 2016.

It used to be a holding of the Heyperger family.

Population

References

Cities and towns in Bruck an der Leitha District